Mexicaltzingo is a station on Line 12 of the Mexico City Metro. The station is located between Ermita and  Atlalilco. It was opened on 30 October 2012 as a part of the first stretch of Line 12 between Mixcoac and Tláhuac.

The station is located south of the city center, at the intersection between Eje 2 Ote Calzada de la Viga and Eje 8 Sur Calzada Ermita-Iztapalapa. It is built underground.

The name of the station is taken from that of the colonia it is located in. The station's icon depicts the god Mexictli sitting on top of an inverted maguey plant, in reference to Mexicaltzingo's symbol in the Codex of Coatlinchan.

Ridership

References

External links 
 

Mexicaltzingo
Railway stations opened in 2012
2012 establishments in Mexico
Mexico City Metro stations in Iztapalapa
Accessible Mexico City Metro stations